The Archaeological Museum of Nicopolis is a museum in Nicopolis, in the Preveza regional unit in northwestern Greece.

History
Until 1940, the ‘’Archaeological Museum of Preveza – Nicopolis’’ was located in an Ottoman mosque, in the city of Preveza, Greece. In 1940, the mosque was bombed by Italian aircraft and was  partially destroyed. Some of the exhibits were stolen. After the Second World War, the mosque was demolished by the Greek state. In 1965 the state built a small Archaeological Museum inside the Byzantine walls of ancient Nicopolis: . From 1998 to 2006 a new archaeological museum was built 5 km North of Preveza.
In July 2009, the new Archaeological museum of Nicopolis was open to public (http://www.visit-preveza.com/museum_nikopoli ). The Nicopolis Museum is open every day from 8 am to 8pm, including Saturday and Sunday (more information on the official web-site at http://odysseus.culture.gr/h/3/eh355.jsp?obj_id=2575 ).

Exhibits
Marble tomb sculpture, with the name of the deceased, his father, his profession, his age.
Marble oblation altar, dedicated to Empress Sabine, wife of Emperor Hadrian.
Marble sarcophagus, with lions, flowers, etc.
Marble sitting lion of the 4th century BC
Marble statue of goddess Minerva - a Roman copy of 4th century BC
Marble statue of a muse called the "small Heracliotis"
Broken marble head of General Agrippa, reconstructed.
Marble head of Faustina, wife of Emperor Marcus Aurelius, who appears to suffer from strabismus.
Marble Cylindrical base of a statue, with a relief the  Battle of the Amazons (Amazonomachia). It has been partially reused as a Christian mosaic, from the Alkysson Basilica.
Marble plaque with an ancient symposium (a postcital man and a woman)
Glass urn, coins, and hair pins from Odeum.
New exhibits: Many important new exhibits are being prepared for the new museum, and will go on display in 2010. Many of them were found at the site of the Monument of Augustus between the years 1995-2005.

Gallery

External links
Hellenic Ministry of Culture and Tourism
www.planetware.com
http://prevezamuseum.spaces.live.com Search with your browser for Archaeological Museum of Nicopolis (not Nikopolis) and press on the right column link to get an excellent slide-show of the museums (old and new) and many of the exhibits.

Nicopolis
Preveza